HMS Tapageur was the French privateer cutter Tapageur, launched in 1778 or 1779, possibly at Dunkirk. The British captured her in 1779, while she was operating out of Saint Malo. She wrecked a year later in the West Indies.

Career
The British warships Apollo, and  captured Tapaguer, of Saint-Malo, on 15March 1779. A report in the Mercure has her striking on the arrival of three British warships after she had held off a British privateer of 20 guns for four-and-a-half hours.

Tapageur was commissioned into the Royal Navy in May under the command of Lieutenant Lord Charles FitzGerald. She then spent the summer in Admiral Hardy's fleet in the Channel. In late 1779 she was at Portsmouth, attached to Admiral Rodney's fleet, which was preparing to take troops to Gibraltar, Minorca, and the West Indies. The fleet sailed on Christmas Day from St Helens, Isle of Wight.

Fate
Tapageur was wrecked in March while warping into Carenage Bay at Saint Lucia. The British had captured Saint Lucia in December, though Tapageur arrived too late to participate.

Questionable information
Although the records are clear that Tapageur was wrecked, there are later accounts of her continued service. Second, she appears in order of battle at the Battle of Porto Praya under the command of Lieutenant Philip D'Auvergne. Then she accompanied  on a reconnaissance towards the Cape of Good Hope and returned to Porto Praya with the news of the presence at Saldanha Bay of five Dutch East Indiamen. The British sailed there and captured four (the fifth was destroyed) at the Battle of Saldanha Bay. However, none of these accounts is supported by primary sources.

Notes, citations, and references
Notes

Citations

References

External links
 

1778 ships
Cutters of the Royal Navy
Captured ships
Maritime incidents in 1780